The Virginia Slims of Arkansas is a defunct WTA Tour affiliated tennis tournament played from 1986 to 1987. It was held in Little Rock, Arkansas in the United States and played on indoor carpet courts in 1986 and on outdoor hard courts in 1987.

Past finals

Singles

Doubles

References
 WTA Results Archive

External links

Hard court tennis tournaments
Carpet court tennis tournaments
Indoor tennis tournaments
Tennis in Arkansas
Sports in Little Rock, Arkansas
Recurring sporting events established in 1986
Recurring events disestablished in 1987
Virginia Slims tennis tournaments
Defunct tennis tournaments in the United States
1986 establishments in Arkansas
1987 disestablishments in Arkansas
History of women in Arkansas